Dumais is a French-Canadian surname.

Persons
People with this surname include:

 Clarence C. Dumais, U.S. Navy officer, namesake of Antarctic mountain Mount Dumais
 Daniel Dumais, Canadian judge
 Jocelyn Dumais, Canadian politician
 Joseph A. Dumais, a person involved in the Black Dhalia case
 Justin Dumais (born 1978), U.S. Olympic diver
 Kathleen Dumais (born 1958), U.S. politician
 Marc Dumais, Canadian Forces general
 Paschal Dumais (1798–1783), Canadian politician
 Paul Dumais (born 1991), Canadian weightlifter
 Raymond Dumais (1950–2012), Roman Catholic bishop
 Séverin Dumais (1840–1907), Canadian politician
 Susan Dumais, U.S. computer scientist
 Troy Dumais (born 1980) U.S. competitive diver
 Victor Dumais, namesake of the AIAPQ Victor Dumais Trophy

See also

 
 Mais (disambiguation)
 DU (disambiguation)